Azadeh Samadi (born 7 January 1979) is an Iranian actress who has been active since 2006 with acting in cinema and television series.

Early life 
Azadeh Samadi was born on September 8, 1979 in Lahijan. After completing her undergraduate theater studies at Soore University, she completed a course of acting classes (supervised by Parviz Parastooi). She played in the theater production "Behir and Sugar", and after some time was chosen to play in the TV series "The Endless Way" directed by Homayoun Asadiyan. She has performed in the short films "35 meter water level" and "blue teeth", directed by Hooman Seyyed as well as "No One Talking to Anyone".

Azadeh Samadi married Houman Seyyedi in 2006. But this marriage ended in divorce in 2013. Azadeh Samadi was one of the artists supporting Mir Hossein Mousavi during the 2009 presidential election.

Samadi hosted the Zabiwaka program, which was broadcast on the Iowa Internet network for the 2018 World Cup in Russia. And Behrang Alavi, as his replacement, took over the implementation of this program. According to the agents close to this program, while Azadeh Samadi was supposed to be the host of this program, it was announced by the Radio and Television:

 (This use of women is not a tool and there is no reason for a woman to run a men's sports program!)

As a result, it was decided to change her.

Filmography

Film

Web

Television
 Divar be Divar - 2016
 Tehran's roof - 2015
 one among all - 2009
 Gawsandogh - 2008
 Rahe Bipayan - 2007

Theatre 
Samadi acted in Iceland, written by Nicolas Billon.
 Iceland
 No Audience
 Five second snow
 Without milk and sugar (Hamid Amjad)
 Constitutional Lady (Hossein Kiani)
 Sea travelers (Mohammad Aqbati)
 The unfinished narrative of a suspended chapter (Houman Seyyedi)
 After all, whose life is this? (Ashkan Khelinejad)
 A little click (Ahmad Soleimani)
 Show P2 (Morteza Mirmontazemi)
 Rainy City Melody (Hadi Marzban)
 Show original language (Rasoul Kahani)
 Dream show of a midnight night (Mustafa Koushki)
 Five seconds of snow (Morteza Mir Montazemi)
 Iceland (Aida Kikhaei)
 Love letters from the Middle East (Kiomars Moradi)
 Without spectators (Ali Sarabi)

Awards and nominations

See also 
 Cinema of Iran

References

External links 

 
 
 Azadeh Samadi on Instagram

1979 births
Living people
People from Lahijan
Iranian film actresses
Iranian stage actresses
Soore University alumni
Iranian television actresses
21st-century Iranian actresses